This is a list of plasma physics topics.

A
 Ablation
 Abradable coating
 Abraham–Lorentz force
 Absorption band
 Accretion disk
 Active galactic nucleus
 Adiabatic invariant
 ADITYA (tokamak)
 Aeronomy
 Afterglow plasma
 Airglow
 Air plasma, Corona treatment, Atmospheric-pressure plasma treatment
 Ayaks, Novel "Magneto-plasmo-chemical engine"
 Alcator C-Mod
 Alfvén wave
 Ambipolar diffusion
 Aneutronic fusion
 Anisothermal plasma
 Anisotropy
 Antiproton Decelerator
 Appleton-Hartree equation
 Arcing horns
 Arc lamp
 Arc suppression
 ASDEX Upgrade, Axially Symmetric Divertor EXperiment
 Astron (fusion reactor)
 Astronomy
 Astrophysical plasma
 Astrophysical X-ray source
 Atmospheric dynamo
 Atmospheric escape
 Atmospheric pressure discharge
 Atmospheric-pressure plasma
 Atom
 Atomic emission spectroscopy
 Atomic physics
 Atomic-terrace low-angle shadowing
 Auger electron spectroscopy
 Aurora (astronomy)

B
 Babcock Model
 Ball lightning
 Ball-pen probe
 Ballooning instability
 Baryon acoustic oscillations
 Beam-powered propulsion
 Beta (plasma physics)
 Birkeland current
 Blacklight Power
 Blazar
 Bohm diffusion
 Bohr–van Leeuwen theorem
 Boltzmann relation
 Bow shock
 Bremsstrahlung
 Bussard ramjet

C
 Capacitively coupled plasma
 Carbon nanotube metal matrix composites
 Cassini–Huygens, Cassini Plasma Spectrometer
 Cathode ray
 Cathodic arc deposition
 Ceramic discharge metal-halide lamp
 Charge carrier
 Charged-device model
 Charged particle
 Chemical plasma
 Chemical vapor deposition
 Chemical vapor deposition of diamond
 Chirikov criterion
 Chirped pulse amplification
 Chromatography detector
 Chromo–Weibel instability
 Classical-map hypernetted-chain method
 Cnoidal wave
 Colored-particle-in-cell
 Coilgun
 Cold plasma, Ozone generator
 Collisionality
 Colored-particle-in-cell
 Columbia Non-neutral Torus
 Comet tail
 Compact toroid
 Compressibility
 Compton–Getting effect
 Contact lithography
 Coupling (physics)
 Convection cell
 Cooling flow
 Corona
 Corona discharge
 Corona ring
 Coronal loop
 Coronal radiative losses
 Coronal seismology
 Cosmic microwave background radiation
 Cotton–Mouton effect
 Coulomb collision
 Coulomb explosion
 Columbia Non-neutral Torus
 Crackle tube
 Critical ionization velocity
 Crookes tube
 Current sheet
 Cutoff frequency
 Cyclotron radiation

D
 Debye length
 Debye sheath
 Deep reactive-ion etching
 Degenerate matter
 Degree of ionization
 DEMO, DEMOnstration Power Plant
 Dense plasma focus
 Dielectric barrier discharge
 Diffusion damping
 DIII-D (tokamak)
 Dimensional analysis
 Diocotron instability
 Direct-current discharge
 Directed-energy weapon
 Direct bonding
 distribution function
 Doppler broadening
 Doppler effect
 Double layer (plasma)
 Dual segmented Langmuir probe, Non-Maxwellian Features in Ionospheric Plasma
 Duoplasmatron
 Dusty plasma
 Dynamo theory

E
 Earth's magnetic field
 EAST, Experimental Advanced Superconducting Tokamak
 Ectons
 Eddington luminosity
 Edge-localized mode
 Ekman number
 Elastic collision
 Electrical breakdown
 Electrical conductor
 Electrical mobility
 Electrical resistance and conductance
 Electrical resistivity and conductivity
 Electrical treeing
 Electrically powered spacecraft propulsion
 Electric-field screening
 Electric arc
 Electric arc furnace, Plasma arc furnace
 Electric current
 Electric discharge
 Electric spark
 Electric Tokamak
 Electrothermal-chemical technology, uses plasma cartridge, Triple coaxial plasma igniter
 Electrodeless plasma excitation
 Electrodeless plasma thruster
 Electrodynamic tether, Flowing Plasma Effect
 Electrohydrodynamic thruster
 Electrolaser, Laser-Induced Plasma Channel
 Electromagnetic electron wave
 Electromagnetic field
 Electromagnetic pulse
 Electromagnetic spectrum
 Electron-cloud effect
 Electron
 Electron avalanche
 Electron beam ion trap
 Electron cyclotron resonance
 Electron density
 Electron energy loss spectroscopy
 Electron gun
 Electron microprobe
 Electron spiral toroid
 Electron temperature
 Electronvolt
 Electron wake
 Electrostatic discharge
 Electrostatic ion cyclotron wave
 Electrostatic ion thruster
 Electrosurgery
 Electrothermal instability
 Electroweak epoch
 Elemental analysis
 Elliptic flow
 Emission spectrum
 Energetic neutral atom
 Energy density
 Energy filtered transmission electron microscopy
 Evanescent wave
 Evershed effect
 Excimer lamp
 Excimer laser
 Extraordinary optical transmission
 Extreme ultraviolet
 Extreme ultraviolet lithography

F
 Failure analysis
 FalconSAT
 Faraday cup
 Faraday effect, Faraday rotation in the ionosphere
 Far-infrared laser
 Farley-Buneman instability
 Fast Auroral Snapshot Explorer
 Ferritic nitrocarburizing, Plasma-assisted ferritic nitrocarburizing, plasma ion nitriding
 Ferrofluid
 Field line
 Field-reversed configuration
 Filament propagation
 Finite-difference time-domain method
 Fire
 Fisher's equation
 Fission fragment reactor
 Fission-fragment rocket, Dusty Plasma Based Fission Fragment Nuclear Reactor
 Flame plasma
 Flare spray
 Flashtube
 Flatness problem
 Flowing-afterglow mass spectrometry
 Fluid dynamics
 Fluorescent lamp
 Forbidden mechanism
 Force-free magnetic field
 Free-electron laser
 Free electron model
 F region, Appleton layer
 Frequency classification of plasmas
 Fusion energy gain factor
 Fusion power
 fusion torch
 fusor

G
 Galactic corona
 Galactic halo
 Gas
 Gas-filled tube
 Gas core reactor rocket
 Gas cracker, plasma cracking
 Gas Electron Multiplier
 Gaseous fission reactor
 Gaseous ionisation detectors
 Gas focusing
 Gasification, Plasma gasifier
 Geissler tube
 General Fusion
 Geomagnetic storm
 Geothermal Anywhere
 Glasser effect
 Glass frit bonding
 Glow discharge
 Glow-discharge optical emission spectroscopy (GDOES)
 Grad–Shafranov equation
 Granule (solar physics)
 Great Rift (astronomy)
 GreenSun Energy
 Guiding center
 Gunn–Peterson trough
 GYRO
 Gyrokinetic ElectroMagnetic
 Gyrokinetics
 Gyroradius
 Gyrotron

H
 Hadronization
 Hagedorn temperature, Transition to Quark-Gluon Plasma
 Hall effect
 Hall-effect thruster
 Hasegawa–Mima equation
 Heat shield
 Heat torch
 Helically Symmetric Experiment
 Helicon double-layer thruster
 Helicon (physics)
 Heliosphere
 Heliospheric current sheet
 Helium
 Helium line ratio
 Helmet streamer
 Hessdalen light
 High beta fusion reactor
 High-energy nuclear physics
 High-frequency Active Auroral Research Program
 High harmonic generation
 High-intensity discharge lamp
 High Power Impulse Magnetron Sputtering
 High voltage
 HiPER, High-Power laser Energy Research facility
 Hiss (electromagnetic), Plasmaspheric hiss
 Hollow cathode effect
 Hollow-cathode lamp
 Holtsmark distribution
 Homopolar generator
 Horizon problem
 Hydrogen
 Hydrogen sensor
 Hypernova
 Hypersonic speed
 Hypersonic wind tunnel
 Hypervelocity
 Hypertherm

I
 IEEE Nuclear and Plasma Sciences Society
 IGNITOR
 IMAGE, Imager for Magnetopause-to-Aurora Global Exploration, Radio Plasma Imager
 Impalefection
 Impulse generator
 Incoherent scatter
 Induction plasma technology
 Inductively coupled plasma
 Inductively coupled plasma atomic emission spectroscopy
 Inductively coupled plasma mass spectrometry
 Inelastic mean free path
 inertial confinement fusion
 Inertial electrostatic confinement
 Inertial fusion power plant
 Instability
 Insulated-gate bipolar transistor
 Insulator (electrical)
 Interbol
 Intergalactic medium
 International Reference Ionosphere
 Interplanetary magnetic field
 Interplanetary medium
 Interplanetary scintillation
 Interstellar medium
 Interstellar nebula
 Interstellar travel
 Intracluster medium
 Io-Jupiter flux tube
 Ion
 Ionized-air glow
 Ion acoustic wave
 Ion beam
 Ion-beam shepherd
 Ion cyclotron resonance
 Ion gun
 Ion laser
 Ion optics
 Ion plating
 Ion source
 Ion wind
 Ionosphere
 Ionospheric heater
 Ionospheric propagation
 Isotope-ratio mass spectrometry, Multiple collector – inductively coupled plasma – mass spectrometry (MC-ICP-MS)
 ITER, International Thermonuclear Experimental Reactor

J
 Jellium, uniform electron gas, homogeneous electron gas
 Jet (particle physics)
 Jet quenching
 Joint European Torus

K
 Kennelly–Heaviside layer, E region
 Kinetics (physics)
 Kink instability
 Kirchhoff's circuit laws
 Kite applications, plasma kite
 Kosterlitz–Thouless transition
 KSTAR, Korea Superconducting Tokamak Advanced Research
 Kværner-process, Plasma burner, Plasma variation

L
 Lagrange point colonization
 Landau damping
 Langmuir probe
 Large Hadron Collider
 Large Helical Device
 Large Plasma Device
 Laser-hybrid welding
 Laser-induced breakdown spectroscopy, Laser Induced Plasma Spectroscopy
 Laser-induced fluorescence
 Laser ablation
 Laser ablation synthesis in solution
 Laser plasma acceleration
 Lawson criterion
 Lerche–Newberger sum rule
 Le Sage's theory of gravitation
 Levitated dipole
 LIDAR
 Lightcraft
 Lightning
 LINUS (Fusion Experiment)
 List of hydrodynamic instabilities
 List of plasma physicists
 LOFAR, Low Frequency Array
 Longitudinal wave
 Lorentz force
 Low-energy electron diffraction
 Lower hybrid oscillation
 Low-pressure discharge
 Luminescent solar concentrator
 Lundquist number
 Luttinger liquid

M
 Madison Symmetric Torus
 MagBeam, also called Magnetized beamed plasma propulsion, plasma wind
 Magnetic bottle
 Magnetic braking
 Magnetic cloud
 Magnetic confinement fusion
 Magnetic diffusivity
 Magnetic field
 Magnetic field oscillating amplified thruster, Plasma Engine
 Magnetic helicity
 Magnetic mirror
 Magnetic Prandtl number
 Magnetic pressure
 Magnetic proton recoil neutron spectrometer
 Magnetic radiation reaction force
 Magnetic reconnection
 Magnetic Reynolds number
 Magnetic sail, Mini-magnetospheric plasma propulsion
 Magnetic tail
 Magnetic tension force
 Magnetic weapon
 Magnetization reversal by circularly polarized light
 Magnetized target fusion
 Magnetogravity wave
 Magnetohydrodynamic drive
 MHD generator
 Magnetohydrodynamics
 Magnetohydrodynamic turbulence
 Magneto-optical trap
 Magnetopause
 Magnetoplasmadynamic thruster
 Magnetosheath
 Magnetosonic wave, also magnetoacoustic wave
 Magnetosphere
 Magnetosphere chronology
 Magnetosphere of Saturn, Sources and transport of plasma
 Magnetosphere particle motion
 Magnetospheric Multiscale Mission
 Magnetotellurics
 MAGPIE, stands for Mega Ampere Generator for Plasma Implosion Experiments, Marx generator
 MARAUDER, acronym of Magnetically Accelerated Ring to Achieve Ultra-high Directed Energy and Radiation
 Marchywka Effect
 Marfa lights
 Many-body problem
 Mars Express
 Mass driver, or electromagnetic catapult
 Mass spectrometry
 Material point method
 Maxwell–Boltzmann distribution
 Maxwell's equations
 Mechanically Stimulated Gas Emission
 Mega Ampere Spherical Tokamak
 Metallic bond
 Metallizing
 Metamaterial antenna
 Microplasma
 Microstructured optical arrays
 Microturbulence
 Microwave digestion
 Microwave discharge
 Microwave plasma-assisted CVD
 Microwave plasma
 Migma
 MIT Plasma Science and Fusion Center
 Moreton wave
 Multipactor effect

N
 Nanoflares
 Nanoparticle
 Nanoscale plasmonic motor
 Nanoshell
 National Compact Stellarator Experiment
 National Spherical Torus Experiment
 Navier–Stokes equations
 Negative index metamaterials
 Negative resistance
 Negative temperature
 Neon lighting
 Neon sign
 Neutral beam injection
 Neutron generator
 Neutron source
 Neutron star spin-up
 New Horizons, Plasma and high energy particle spectrometer suite (PAM)
 Nitrogen–phosphorus detector
 Nonequilibrium Gas and Plasma Dynamics Laboratory
 Non-line-of-sight propagation
 Non-thermal microwave effect
 Nonthermal plasma, Cold plasma
 Nuclear fusion, Bremsstrahlung losses in quasineutral, isotropic plasmas, deuterium plasma
 Nuclear pulse propulsion
 Nuclear pumped laser
 Numerical diffusion
 Numerical resistivity

O
 Ohmic contact
 Onset of deconfinement
 Optode
 Optoelectric nuclear battery
 Orbitrap
 Outer space

P
 Particle-in-cell
 Particle accelerator
 Paschen's law
 Peek's law
 Pegasus Toroidal Experiment
 Penning mixture
 Penrose criterion
 Perhapsatron
 Phased plasma gun
 Photon
 Photonic metamaterial
 Photonics
 Physical cosmology
 Physical vapor deposition
 Piezoelectric direct discharge plasma
 Pinch (plasma physics)
 Planetary nebula
 Planetary nebula luminosity function
 Plasma-desorption mass spectrometry
 Plasma-enhanced chemical vapor deposition
 Plasma-immersion ion implantation
 Plasma-powered cannon
 Plasma (physics)
 Plasma acceleration
 Plasma Acoustic Shield System
 Plasma activated bonding
 Plasma activation
 Plasma actuator
 Plasma antenna
 Plasma arc waste disposal, Incineration
 Plasma arc welding
 Plasma channel
 Plasma chemistry
 Plasma cleaning
 Plasma Contactor
 Plasma containment
 Plasma conversion
 Plasma cosmology, ambiplasma
 Plasma cutting, Plasma gouging
 Plasma deep drilling technology
 Plasma diagnostics, Self Excited Electron Plasma Resonance Spectroscopy (SEERS)
 Plasma display
 Plasma effect
 Plasma electrolytic oxidation
 Plasma etcher
 Plasma etching
 Plasma frequency
 Plasma functionalization
 Plasma gasification commercialization
 Plasma globe
 Plasma lamp
 Plasma medicine
 Plasma modeling
 Plasma nitriding
 Plasma oscillation
 Plasma parameter
 Plasma parameters
 Plasma pencil
 Plasma polymerization
 Plasma processing
 Plasma propulsion engine
 Plasma Pyrolysis Waste Treatment and Disposal
 Plasma receiver
 Plasma scaling
 Plasma shaping
 Plasma sheet
 Plasma shield, Plasma window
 Plasma sound source
 Plasma source
 Plasma speaker
 Plasma spray
 Plasma spraying, Thermal spraying, Surface finishing
 Plasma stability
 Plasma stealth
 Plasma torch
 Plasma transferred wire arc thermal spraying
 Plasma valve
 Plasma weapon
 Plasma weapon (fiction)
 Plasma window, Force field
 Plasmadynamics and Electric Propulsion Laboratory
 Plasmaphone
 Plasmapper
 Plasmaron
 Plasmasphere
 Plasmoid
 Plasmon
 Plasmonic cover, Theories of cloaking
 Plasmonic laser, Nanolaser
 Plasmonic metamaterials
 Plasmonic nanolithography
 Plasmonic Nanoparticles
 Plasmonic solar cell
 Polarization density
 Polarization ripples
 Polar (satellite)
 Polymeric surfaces
 Polywell
 Ponderomotive force
 Princeton field-reversed configuration experiment
 Propulsive Fluid Accumulator, nuclear-powered magnetohydrodynamic electromagnetic plasma thruster
 Proton beam
 Pseudospark switch
 Pulsed Energy Projectile
 Pulsed laser deposition, Dynamic of the plasma
 Pulsed plasma thruster, also Plasma Jet Engines

Q
 Q-machine
 QCD matter
 Quadrupole ion trap
 Quantum cascade laser
 Quark–gluon plasma
 Quarkonium
 Quasar
 Quasiparticle

R
 Radiation
 Radiation damage
 Radical polymerization
 Radioactive waste
 Radio atmospheric
 Radio galaxy
 Radio halo
 Radio relics
 Railgun
 Radio Aurora Explorer (RAX)
 Random phase approximation
 Ray tracing (physics)
 Reactive-ion etching
 Reaction engine
 Rectifier, Plasma type
 Refractive index
 Reionization
 Relativistic beaming
 Relativistic jet
 Relativistic particle
 Relativistic plasma
 Relativistic similarity parameter
 Remote plasma-enhanced CVD
 Resistive ballooning mode
 Resolved sideband cooling
 Resonant magnetic perturbations
 Resonator mode
 Reversed field pinch
 Richtmyer–Meshkov instability
 Riggatron
 Ring current
 Rocket engine nozzle
 Runaway breakdown
 Rydberg atom
 Rydberg matter

S
 Safety factor (plasma physics)
 Saha ionization equation
 Sceptre (fusion reactor)
 Scramjet
 Screened Poisson equation
 SEAgel, Safe Emulsion Agar gel
 Selected-ion flow-tube mass spectrometry
 Self-focusing
 Sensitive high-resolution ion microprobe
 Shielding gas
 Shiva laser
 Shiva Star
 Shock diamond
 Shocks and discontinuities (magnetohydrodynamics)
 Shock wave, Oblique shock
 Skin effect
 Skip zone
 Sky brightness
 Skywave
 Slapper detonator
 Small Tight Aspect Ratio Tokamak
 Solar cycle, Cosmic ray flux
 Solar flare
 Solar Orbiter, Radio and Plasma Wave analyser
 Solar prominence
 Solar transition region
 Solar wind
 Solenoid
 Solution precursor plasma spray, Plasma plume
 Sonoluminescence
 South Atlantic Anomaly
 Southern Hemisphere Auroral Radar Experiment
 Space physics
 Spacequake
 Space Shuttle
 Space Shuttle thermal protection system
 Space tether missions
 Spark-gap transmitter
 Spark plasma sintering
 Spaser
 Spectral imaging
 Spectral line
 Spherical tokamak
 Spheromak
 Spinplasmonics
 Spontaneous emission
 Spreeta
 Sprite (lightning)
 Sputter cleaning
 Sputter deposition
 Sputtering
 SSIES, Special Sensors-Ions, Electrons, and Scintillation thermal plasma analysis package
 SST-1 (tokamak), Steady State Tokamak
 Star
 Star lifting
 State of matter
 Static forces and virtual-particle exchange
 Stellarator
 Stellar-wind bubble
 St. Elmo's fire
 Strahl (astronomy)
 Strangeness production
 Strontium vapor laser
 Structure formation
 Sudden ionospheric disturbance
 Sun
 SUNIST, Sino-UNIted Spherical Tokamak, Alfven wave current drive experiments in spherical tokamak plasmas
 Superlens, Plasmon-assisted microscopy
 Supernova
 Supernova remnants
 Sura Ionospheric Heating Facility
 Surface-wave-sustained mode
 Surface enhanced Raman spectroscopy
 Surface plasmon
 Surface plasmon polaritons
 Surface plasmon resonance
 Suspension plasma spray
 Synchrotron light source

T
 Taylor state
 Teller–Ulam design, Foam plasma pressure
 Tesla coil
 Test particle, in plasma physics or electrodynamics
 Thermal barrier coating
 Thermalisation
 Thermionic converter
 Thermodynamic temperature
 Thomson scattering
 Thunder
 Tokamak
 Tokamak à configuration variable
 Tokamak Fusion Test Reactor
 Toroidal ring model
 Townsend discharge
 Townsend (unit)
 Transformation optics
 Transmission medium
 Trisops, Force Free Plasma Vortices
 Tunable diode laser absorption spectroscopy
 Tweeter, Plasma or Ion tweeter
 Two-dimensional guiding-center plasma
 Two-dimensional point vortex gas
 Two-stream instability

U
 U-HID, Ultra High Intensity Discharge
 UMIST linear system
 Undulator
 Upper hybrid oscillation
 Upper-atmospheric lightning

V
 Vacuum arc, thermionic vacuum arc generates a pure metal and ceramic vapour plasma
 Van Allen radiation belt
 Vapor–liquid–solid method
 Variable Specific Impulse Magnetoplasma Rocket
 Vector inversion generator
 Versatile Toroidal Facility
 Violet wand
 Virial theorem
 Vlasov equation
 Volatilisation
 VORPAL, Versatile Object-oriented Relativistic Plasma Analysis with Lasers
 Voyager program, Plasma Wave Subsystem

W
 Warm dense matter
 Wave equation
 Waves in plasmas
 Wave turbulence
 Weibel instability
 Wendelstein 7-X
 Wiggler (synchrotron)
 WIND (spacecraft)
 Wingless Electromagnetic Air Vehicle
 Wireless energy transfer
 Wouthuysen-Field coupling

X
 XANES, X-ray Absorption Near Edge Structure
 Xenon arc lamp
 X-ray transient
 X-ray astronomy
 X-shaped radio galaxy

Y

Z
 Zakharov system
 Zero-point energy
 ZETA (fusion reactor)
 Zonal and poloidal
 Zonal flow (plasma)
 Z Pulsed Power Facility

See also

References

Physics-related lists

Indexes of science articles
Plasma physics